The South African Railways Class 7A 4-8-0 of 1896 was a steam locomotive from the pre-Union era in the Cape of Good Hope.

Between 1896 and 1901, the Cape Government Railways placed a second batch of altogether 46 7th Class steam locomotives with a 4-8-0 Mastodon wheel arrangement in service on its Midland and Eastern Systems. In 1912, when all but two of them were assimilated into the South African Railways, they were renumbered and designated .

In 1897 and 1898, during Kitchener's military campaign in Sudan, eight Cape 7th Class locomotives were built to the same design for the Soudan Military Railway.

Manufacturers
The original Cape 7th Class locomotive had been designed in 1892 by H.M. Beatty, at the time the Cape Government Railways (Western System) Locomotive Superintendent.

Following on the 38 7th Class locomotives which were placed in service by the Cape Government Railways (CGR) between 1892 and 1893, a second batch of 46 slightly improved locomotives were acquired between 1896 and 1901. Outwardly, all these locomotives appeared almost identical to the first batch of 7th Class locomotives, but they had increased heating capacity as well as some other modifications.

1896
In 1896, orders were placed for 28 locomotives, distributed between three manufacturers.
 Sharp, Stewart and Company built eight for the Midland System, numbered in the range from 385 to 392.
 Dübs and Company built eight for the Eastern System, numbered in the range from 718 to 723, 740 and 741.
 Neilson and Company built six for the Midland System, numbered in the range from 393 to 398, and another six for the Eastern System, numbered in the range from 724 to 729.

1897

In 1897, a further four 7th Class locomotives were ordered by the CGR from Neilson, for use on the new Vryburg to Bulawayo line of the fledgling Bechuanaland Railway Company (BR). The line was still under construction and was operated by the CGR on behalf of the BR at the time. These 7th Class locomotives, numbered in the range from BR4 to BR7, were eventually returned to the CGR and renumbered in the range from 347 to 350 for the Midland System.

In 1897 and 1898, Neilson also built eight Cape 7th Class locomotives for the Soudan Military Railway, where they were known as the Dongola Class.

1898
In 1898, another ten 7th Class locomotives were taken into service by the CGR, as well as another three by the Imvani-Indwe Railway which operated a branch line from Sterkstroom to the Indwe Collieries in the Eastern Cape.
 Sharp Stewart built one 7th Class for the Imvani-Indwe, which was named E.J. Byrne by the colliery. It was eventually taken onto the CGR roster and became the Eastern System's no. 742.
 Dübs built two for the Imvani-Indwe, which were named Bradfield and Gardner Williams. They were also eventually taken onto the CGR roster and became the Eastern System's numbers 743 and 744 respectively.
 At the same time, Dübs built ten for the CGR, which were numbered in the range from 730 to 739 on the Eastern System.

1901
One more 7th Class locomotive was delivered by Dübs in 1901 and became the Eastern System's no. 758.

Class 7 sub-classes
When the Union of South Africa was established on 31 May 1910, the three Colonial government railways (CGR, Natal Government Railways and Central South African Railways) were united under a single administration to control and administer the railways, ports and harbours of the Union. Although the South African Railways and Harbours came into existence in 1910, the actual classification and renumbering of all the rolling stock of the three constituent railways were only implemented with effect from 1 January 1912.

When all but two of these 46 locomotives were assimilated into the South African Railways (SAR) in 1912, they were renumbered in the range from 988 to 1031 and designated Class 7A. The two exceptions had been sold to Pauling and Company in 1909.

The rest of the CGR's 7th Class locomotives, together with 7th Class locomotives from the Central South African Railways (CSAR), the Pretoria-Pietersburg Railway (PPR), the Rhodesia Railways (RR), the Natal Government Railways (NGR) and, in 1925, the New Cape Central Railways (NCCR), were grouped into six different sub-classes by the SAR and designated Classes 7 and 7B to 7F.

Modification
During the 1930s and later, many of the Class 7 series locomotives were equipped with superheated boilers and piston valves. On the Class 7B and Class 7C, this conversion was sometimes indicated with an "S" suffix to the class number on the locomotive's number plates, but on the rest of the Class 7 family this distinction was rarely applied. The superheated versions could be visually identified by the position of the chimney on the smokebox, the chimney having been displaced forward to provide space behind it in the smokebox for the superheater header.

In the early 1960s, Class 7A no. 1021 was reportedly equipped with a superheater and reclassified to the sole Class 7AS. The number plate was altered by weld-writing a crude "S" after the "7A". This locomotive spent its last working days on the SAR doing steam heating tests on mainline passenger coaches at the Braamfontein North passenger yard in Johannesburg, before being sold to the Zambesi Saw Mills (ZSM) in 1971. The ZSM engineer's records, however, show it as not superheated and having saturated boiler no. 7865.

Renumbering
During their long service lives, some of the Class 7A locomotives underwent more than one renumbering. Five saw service with the Imperial Military Railways (IMR) during the Second Boer War and were temporarily renumbered accordingly, three were unnumbered, but named, while in Imvani-Indwe colliery service and all but two were eventually renumbered onto the SAR roster in 1912. Table 1 lists these renumberings as well as their builders and works numbers.

When the four BR locomotives, numbers BR 4 to BR 7, were eventually returned to CGR service and renumbered in the range from 347 to 350 for the Midland System, it resulted in number duplication which confused historians in later years. These four engine numbers had been used previously on four of the 1892 and 1893 batch of 7th Class locomotives, also built by Neilson, which had since been renumbered in the range from 712 to 715 when they were transferred from the Midland to the Eastern System.

Service

South Africa
The 7th Class series became the main goods locomotive class for the last twenty years of the existence of the CGR. In SAR service, the Class 7 series worked on every system in the country. Of this second batch of the Class, not all began their service lives on the CGR, and not all remained with the CGR until the SAR came into existence. In summary:
 Four originally began their service lives on the BR, between Vryburg in the Cape Colony and Bulawayo in Southern Rhodesia, and were eventually returned to the CGR and renumbered 347 to 350 for the Cape Midland.
 Four from the 1896 and one from the 1898 batches saw service with the IMR during the Second Boer War from 1899 to 1902, having been allocated to the IMR for the duration of the war.
 Two locomotives, numbers 348 and 398, were sold to Pauling and Company in 1909, for use during the construction of the Rhodesia Katanga Junction Railway (RKJR) in Northern Rhodesia. The RKJR purchased them from Paulings in 1910, after which they went to the Mashonaland Railway Company in 1928, and eventually to the RR in 1936. They retained their CGR engine numbers for their entire working lives, until they were scrapped by the RR in 1938.
 The Imvani-Indwe Railway's three 7th Class engines were taken onto the CGR roster and numbered 742 to 744 for service on the Eastern System, before the 1912 amalgamation into the SAR.

South West Africa

In 1915, shortly after the outbreak of the First World War, the German South West Africa colony was occupied by the Union Defence Forces. Since a large part of the territory's railway infrastructure and rolling stock was destroyed or damaged by retreating German forces, an urgent need arose for locomotives for use on the Cape gauge lines in that territory. In 1917, numbers 1000 to 1002, 1005, 1006, 1017, 1019 and 1021 to 1024 were transferred to the Defence Department for service in South West Africa.

These eleven locomotives remained in South West Africa after the war. They proved to be so successful in that territory, that more were gradually transferred there in later years. By the time the Class 24 locomotives arrived in SWA in 1949, 53 locomotives of the Class 7 family were still in use there.

Most remained there, and were only transferred back to South Africa when the Class 32-000 diesel-electric locomotives replaced them in 1961. In South Africa, they remained in branchline service until they were finally withdrawn in 1972.

Industrial
Four Class 7A locomotives, numbers 992 and 1006 in 1966, and 993 and 1021 in 1971, as well as two Class 7 and two Class 7B locomotives were sold to the Zambesi Saw Mills (ZSM) in Zambia. The company worked the teak forests which stretched  to the north-west of Livingstone, where it built one of the longest logging railways in the world to serve its sawmill at Mulobezi. These eight locomotives joined eight ex RR 7th Class locomotives which had been acquired by the ZSM between 1925 and 1956.
 
Railway operations ceased at Mulobezi around 1972 and operation of the line to Livingstone was taken over by the Zambia Railways in 1973. While most of the Class 7 series locomotives remained at Mulobezi out of use, Class 7A no. 1021 was installed at the Livingstone factory to supply steam for curing wood.

Preservation

Sudan's Dongola Class

Cape 7th Class locomotives were also built for the Soudan Military Railway during Kitchener's campaign in Sudan. For motive power, three Cape 7th Class locomotives, built to the Class 7A design and known as the Dongola Class in Sudan, were ordered from Neilson and delivered in 1897. These were followed by five more in two batches in 1898. They were initially not numbered, but named after places in Sudan.

Their works numbers, order numbers, names and eventual Sudan Railway (SR) numbers, are listed in Table 2. SR no. 29, which was originally named Berber according to Neilson's records, was later renamed Fashoda/Suakin.

These locomotives were equipped with gates across the open ends of their cabs and pipes under the running board on the right side, which terminated in hose connections below the front buffer beam, so that water tenders could be coupled to the front and they could be run cab forward. The reason was that they were used on a single line which was still being constructed into the desert from Wadi Halfa and which initially had no water supply at the far end.

For some reason, these locomotives were not popular in the Sudan and they were all withdrawn from service by 1914.

Illustration

References

1460
1460
4-8-0 locomotives
2D locomotives
Sharp Stewart locomotives
Dübs locomotives
Neilson locomotives
Cape gauge railway locomotives
Railway locomotives introduced in 1896
1896 in South Africa